Youcef Douar (born 15 September 1997) is an Algerian footballer who plays as a defender for Paradou AC in the Algerian Ligue Professionnelle 1.

Career

Paradou AC
A graduate of the club's youth academy, Douar made his professional debut on 12 May 2018, playing the entirety of a 5–0 victory over Olympique de Médéa.

In August 2021, following a match against CR Belouizdad, Douar received a four-game suspension and a 40,000 dinar fine for insulting a match official.

International
Douar has represented Algeria at several youth levels, including U20, U21, and U23.

Career statistics

Club

References

External links
Youcef Douar at SofaScore
Youcef Douar at Eurosport

Living people
1997 births
Paradou AC players
Algerian Ligue Professionnelle 1 players
Algerian footballers
Algeria youth international footballers
Association football defenders